Clarence Ellis (born February 11, 1950) is a former American football safety with the Atlanta Falcons in the National Football League (NFL). He was the Falcons first pick in the 1972 NFL Draft.

He played his college football at Notre Dame, where he was an All-American and part of the Fighting Irish team that defeated the previously undefeated Texas Longhorns in the 1971 Cotton Bowl game.

References

Living people
1950 births
All-American college football players
American football safeties
Atlanta Falcons players
Notre Dame Fighting Irish football players